The Administration for Children and Families (ACF) is a division of the United States Department of Health and Human Services (HHS). It is headed by the Assistant Secretary of Health and Human Services for Children and Families. It has a $49 billion budget for 60 programs that target children, youth and families. These programs include assistance with welfare, child support enforcement, adoption assistance, foster care, child care, and child abuse. The agency employs approximately 1,700 staff, including 1,200 federal employees and 500 contractors, where 60% are based in Washington, DC, with the remaining in  regional offices located in Boston, New York City, Philadelphia, Atlanta, Chicago, Dallas, Kansas City, Denver, San Francisco, Missouri and Seattle.

Mission statement
"The Administration for Children and Families (ACF), within the United States Department of Health and Human Services (HHS), provides national leadership and creates opportunities for families to lead economically and socially productive lives. ACF's programs are designed to help children to develop into healthy adults and communities to become more prosperous and supportive of their members."

History 
ACF's direct predecessor, the Family Support Administration, was created in 1986 by bringing together six existing major programs within HHS.  ACF was created in its present form on April 15, 1991, by merging the Office of Human Development Services, the Family Support Administration, and the Maternal and Child Health Block Grant Program.  Section 6 of Reorganization Plan No. 1 of 1953 provided the legal authority for the reorganization.

Organization
Assistant Secretary
Principal Deputy Assistant Secretary
Administration for Native Americans
Administration for Children, Youth and Families
Children's Bureau
Family and Youth Services Bureau
Office of Community Services
Office of Family Assistance
Office of Refugee Resettlement
Office of Trafficking in Persons
Deputy Assistant Secretary for Early Childhood Development
Office of Child Care
Office of Head Start
Deputy Assistant Secretary for Policy
Deputy Assistant Secretary for External Affairs
Office of Human Services Emergency Preparedness and Response
Office of Regional Operations
Office of the Assistant Secretary
Office of Administration
Office of the Chief Information Officer
Office of Legislative Affairs and Budget
Office of Planning, Research, and Evaluation
Office of Communications

Major goals
ACF is responsible for federal programs that promote the economic and social well-being of families, children, individuals and communities. ACF programs aim to achieve the following: 
families and individuals empowered to increase their own economic independence and productivity;
strong, healthy, supportive communities that have a positive impact on the quality of life and the development of children;
partnerships with individuals, front-line service providers, communities, American Indian tribes, Native communities, states, and Congress that enable solutions which transcend traditional agency boundaries;
services planned, reformed, and integrated to improve needed access;
a strong commitment to working with people with developmental disabilities, refugees, and migrants to address their needs, strengths, and abilities."

Major programs

Administration for Native Americans (ANA) 
Administration on Children, Youth and Families (ACYF)
Administration on Developmental Disabilities (ADD)
Assets for Independence (AFI)
Office of Child Care (OCC) 
Office of Child Support Enforcement (OCSE)
Children's Bureau (CB) 
Family and Youth Services Bureau (FYSB) 
Office of Head Start (OHS)
Healthy Marriage Initiative (HMI)
Office of Community Services (OCS)
Low Income Home Energy Assistance Program (LIHEAP)
Community Services Block Grant (CSBG)
Social Services Block Grant  (SSBG)
Office of Family Assistance (OFA) / Temporary Assistance for Needy Families (TANF) 
Office of Refugee Resettlement (ORR)
President's Committee for People with Intellectual Disabilities (PCPID)

Other initiatives, clearinghouses and resources

Center for Faith-Based and Community Initiatives (CFBCI) 
Child Welfare Information Gateway 
Fatherhood Initiative 
"Insure Kids Now!" Campaign 
National Child Care Information and Technical Assistance Center (NCCIC)
National Clearinghouse on Families and Youth (NCFY) 
National Responsible Fatherhood Clearinghouse
National Healthy Marriage Resource Center (NHMRC) 
Office of Child Support Enforcement Tribal Resources

Abstinence education 
For fiscal year 2006, ending September 30, 2006, Congress appropriated $50 million for state grants for abstinence education programs.  Such programs teach that abstaining from sex is the only effective or acceptable method to prevent pregnancy or disease, and give no instruction on birth control or safe sex. In October 2006, revised guidelines by ACF specified that states seeking grants are "to identify groups ... most likely to bear children out-of-wedlock, targeting adolescents and/or adults within the 12- through 29-year-old age range". Previous guidelines didn't mention specific ages, and programs focused on preteens and teens.

ACF also administers the Community-Based Abstinence Education Program, which is focused on funding public and private entities that provide abstinence-until-marriage education for adolescents from 12 to 18 years old.  For fiscal year 2005, 63 grants were awarded, totaling $104 million to organizations and other entities; in fiscal 2001, grants totaled only $20 million.  In October 2006, the Government Accountability Office reported that ACF does not review its grantees' education materials for scientific accuracy and does not require grantees of either program to review their own materials for scientific accuracy.  GAO also reported that most of the efforts to evaluate the effectiveness of abstinence-until-marriage education programs included in GAO's review have not met certain minimum scientific criteria.

See also
Aid to Families with Dependent Children
Child Abuse Reform and Enforcement Act to promote the improvement of information on, and protections against, child sexual abuse.

Notes

External links
 Administration For Children and Families
 Administration for Children and Families in the Federal Register

United States Department of Health and Human Services agencies